Kano Computing is a global computer hardware and software start-up based in London.

History 
Kano was founded in January 2013 by Alex Klein, Saul Klein, and Yonatan Raz-Fridman. The company's name originates from Kanō Jigorō, the creator of judo. Kano is a computing company that sells kits consisting of raspberry pi single-board computers and various accessories for teaching stem, computing, and robotics to children.

Products 

In August 2013, Kano launched an initial Kano Computer Prototype box. Itconsisted of a small USB keyboard, several prototype booklets, a case, a Raspberry Pi 1, and an SD card loaded with an early version of the Raspbian OS. All 200 prototypes released were sold.

In 2014, the firm launched the Kano Computer Kit, an educational computer kit  to teach hardware assembly and basic programming skills. It was built on Raspberry Pi circuit boards and the company's custom open-source operating system, Kano OS.

In 2018, the firm partnered with Warner Bros to release an electronic Harry Potter wand . The aim, according to the firm,  Kano, was "to teach...the basics of languages like JavaScript, ."

Also in 2018, the firm released motion sensor kits with Frozen and Star Wars themes in a multi-year partnership with Disney. The USB motion sensor detects movement in front of the sensor's receptacle and users were given the ability to program objects based on the motion used above the device.

In 2019, the company partnered with Microsoft to release the Kano PC, a laptop and tablet pre-loaded with both Windows 10 and Kano's educational tools. Later in 2019, Kano launched its first educational subscription, Kano Club, where users can access programming and animation software, lessons and tutorials online. The service also includes a multiplayer component, and a community section.

Kano launched a line of computer accessories in 2020 to coincide with its Kano PC release. These included a mouse, headphones and webcam. In October 2021, the firm began shipping of the Stem Player in partnership with Yeezy Tech and Kanye West.

Funding 
Kano launched a crowdfunding campaign on the Kickstarter platform in November 2013. The company raised over $1.5 million from 13,387 backers, at the time becoming the crowdfunding service's largest learning campaign. Initial backers of the Kano were users from over 80 countries .

In 2016, Kano initiated a second Kickstarter campaign to fund products including a pixel art kit, motion sensor and webcam. The campaign generated $643,030 from 2,399 backers 

In April 2019, Kano announced a £14 million funding package from HSBC.

Alex Klein currently serves as the company's chief executive officer (CEO).

Links to Kanye West 
In January 2019, American musician and businessman Kanye West met Alex Klein during a chance encounter at the CES technology show in Las Vegas.

Since early 2019, the company are said to have been collaborating with West on an undisclosed technology product later revealed in August 2021 to be the Donda Stem Player.

In November 2019, CEO Klein contributed lyrics to the Jesus is King track Water.

In October 2021, Kano began shipping the Donda Stem Player.

In January 2023, in light of West’s antisemitic remarks, Kano announced that their collaboration with West has ended, and that the Donda Stem Player would be discontinued.

Recognition 

In October 2016, the company began to work with Serbian tennis player Novak Djokovic and his charitable foundation to deliver computer kits to Serbian children.

In 2019, Kano was ranked number 24 on Fast Company's 50 Most Innovative Companies list. The company also received Time's Invention of the Year awards in 2018 and 2019. In 2014, the company was awarded a Golden Lion at the Cannes Lions global marketing awards. They were also the recipient of a Webby Award and a CES Award in 2015 and 2018 respectively.

References 

Technology companies based in London
2013 establishments in the United Kingdom
Kickstarter-funded products
Computer companies established in 2013
Computer companies of the United Kingdom
Consumer electronics brands
Home computer hardware companies
Software companies based in London